The Canada women's national field hockey team participates in international field hockey competitions. In 1991, the Canadian men's and women's programs united under the national umbrella of Field Hockey Canada to share funding and infrastructure. The women's team made its first international appearance at the 1978 Women's Hockey World Cup in Madrid, Spain, finishing in fifth place. They were the runner-up at the 1983 Women's Hockey World Cup and the bronze medalists at the 1986 Women's Hockey World Cup.

The Canadian women's team participated in the women's international tournament for the first time in 1956. In 1979 Canada hosted 18 countries in Vancouver for that world event; Canada placed 8th. The 1978 Canadian team was the first to enter the Women's World Cup, and placed 5th.

Tournament records

Team

Current roster
The squad for the 2022 Women's FIH Hockey World Cup.

Head coach: Rob Short

Famous players
 Sharon Bayes
 Laura Branchaud
 Joel Brough
 Nancy Charlton
 Michelle Conn
 Deb Covey
 Sharon Creelman
 Sheila Forshaw
 Jean Major
 Laurelee Kopeck
 Sandra Levy
 Sally Manning
 Darlene Stoyka

See also
 Canada men's national field hockey team
 Field hockey in Canada

References

External links

FIH profile

Field hockey
Americas women's national field hockey teams
Women's field hockey in Canada